The 1896 Alabama Crimson White football team (variously "Alabama", "UA" or "Bama") represented the University of Alabama in the 1896 Southern Intercollegiate Athletic Association football season. The team was led by head coach Otto Wagonhurst, in his first season, and played their home games at The Quad in Tuscaloosa, Alabama. In what was the fifth season of Alabama football, the team finished with a record of two wins and one loss (2–1, 1–1 SIAA).

In spring 1895, the University Board of Trustees passed a rule that prohibited athletic teams from competing off-campus for athletic events. As such, all games scheduled for the 1896 season were played on campus at The Quad. In their first game, Alabama shutout the Birmingham Athletic Club before they lost their only game of the season against Sewanee. The Crimson White then closed the season with their second shutout victory of the year against Mississippi A&M.

Schedule

Game summaries

Birmingham Athletic Club
In the first game played against the Birmingham Athletic Club (B.A.C.) since the 1893 season, Alabama defeated the Athletics 30–0 in Tuscaloosa. Alabama scored their first touchdown early in the first half when a B.A.C. fumble was recovered and returned 50-yards for a touchdown. They scored four more touchdowns and made five successful PAT's in their 30–0 shutout victory. In what was the final all-time contest against the Athletics, the victory improved Alabama's all-time record against the Birmingham Athletic Club to 2–3.

Sewanee
Against Sewanee, Alabama lost their first game of the season, 10–6. The loss brought Alabama's all-time record against Sewanee to 1–2.

Mississippi A&M
In their final game of the season, Alabama defeated the Mississippi A&M Aggies, 20–0, at Tuscaloosa in the first all-time meeting between the long-time rivals. Alabama took a 12–0 halftime lead after Putnam and Frank White scored touchdowns with A. B. McEachin converting both PAT's. In the second half Samuel Slone scored on a 45-yard touchdown run and the Aggies quarterback was sacked for a safety on the last play of the game to make the final score 20–0.

Players

Staff
 Head coach: Otto Wagonhurst
 Manager: Champ Pickens

Notes

References

Alabama
Alabama Crimson Tide football seasons
Alabama Crimson White football